The Proserpina Dam is a Roman gravity dam in Mérida, Extremadura, Spain, dating to the 1st or 2nd century AD.  It was built as part of the infrastructure which supplied the city of Emerita Augusta with water.

After the fall of the Roman Empire, the Milagros aqueduct leading to the city fell into decay, but the earth dam with retaining wall is still in use.

Conservation  
It is also part of the Archaeological Ensemble of Mérida, an UNESCO World Heritage Site since 1993.

See also 
 List of Roman dams and reservoirs
 Roman architecture
 Roman engineering
 List of Bien de Interés Cultural in the Province of Badajoz

Notes

References

Further reading

External links 
 

Roman dams in Spain
Buildings and structures in the Province of Badajoz
Gravity dams
History of Extremadura
Bien de Interés Cultural landmarks in the Province of Badajoz